Mi Vida: La Película (English: My Life: The Movie) is a compilation album by Wisin & Yandel. It also included a movie based on the early days of the duo's careers.

Track listing

References

Wisin & Yandel albums
2005 compilation albums
Albums produced by Luny Tunes